Lamine Ben Aziza (born 10 November 1952) is a Tunisian football goalkeeper who played for Tunisia in the 1978 FIFA World Cup. He also played for Étoile Sportive du Sahel.

References

External links
FIFA profile

1952 births
Tunisian footballers
Tunisia international footballers
Association football goalkeepers
Étoile Sportive du Sahel players
1978 FIFA World Cup players
1978 African Cup of Nations players
Living people